M29 or M-29 may refer to:

 M29 cluster bomb, a World War II era cluster bomb
 M29 mortar, an 81 millimeter calibre mortar
 M29 Weasel, a United States Army tracked vehicle used in World War II
 M29-class monitor, a class of Royal Navy warships
 M29 highway (Russia), a road connecting Krasnodar to Chechnya and Dagestan
 M-29 Davy Crockett Weapon System, a nuclear weapon
 M-29 (Michigan highway), a state highway in Michigan
 M2-9, a planetary nebula located in the constellation Ophiuchus
 Highway M29 (Ukraine), a highway in Ukraine
 M29 (Cape Town), a Metropolitan Route in Cape Town, South Africa
 M29 (Pretoria), a Metropolitan Route in Pretoria, South Africa
 M29 (Durban), a Metropolitan Route in Durban, South Africa
 XM29 OICW, a modern prototype rifle that fired 27 mm HE air bursting projectiles
 Messier 29 (M29), an open star cluster in the constellation Cygnus
 Smith & Wesson Model 29 (S&W M29), a six shot .44 Magnum revolver